George Pearse Ennis (July 21, 1884 – August 1936) was an American artist. He is known for his watercolors and for the stained glass window he designed for Washington Hall, the cadet mess hall at West Point.

Life
Ennis studied at Washington University in St. Louis and at the Chase School. He was a member of the Federal Art Project. He worked in New York City, and, after the 1920s, in Eastport, Maine. Ennis died following an automobile crash near Utica, New York in 1936.

His work is held by the Art Institute of Chicago.

Ennis also taught; among his pupils was Susan Brown Chase.

Works

See also
Paul L. Gill

References

External links

George Pearse Ennis at Askart
River View, ca. 1922, pencil drawing
George Pearse Ennis watercolors held by the Art Institute of Chicago
George Pearse Ennis works at Artfact

1884 births
1936 deaths
20th-century American painters
American male painters
American watercolorists
American muralists
Washington University in St. Louis alumni
Artists from St. Louis
People from Eastport, Maine
Painters from Missouri
Painters from New York City
Painters from Maine
Road incident deaths in New York (state)
Federal Art Project artists